The undulated moray (Gymnothorax undulatus) is a moray eel of the family Muraenidae, found in the Indo-Pacific and east-central Pacific Ocean at depths down to 30 m.  Their length is up to 1.5 m.

Description and biology 
The undulated moray can easily be identified by its yellow head and brown spots covering its body. It is also lined by white borders forming similar to a chain link.  They use their large mouths to pump water to the gills, while the gill cover is a small hole to protect the delicate gills. Like most eels, they lack the pectoral and pelvic fins to make it easier for them to move through the crevices of reefs.  Their other fins are fitted with thicker skin to protect from sharp reef. They move in a S-shape to be able to move back and forth to also aid in movement through reefs. Their teeth are shaped to be curved backwards so they can hold onto their prey and easily move the prey backwards for digestion.

Distribution and habitat 
Gymnothorax undulatus can be found in the Pacific as well as East Africa. Most of the time they can be found in reefs of lagoons and seawards or in reef-flats.   They like to shelter within reefs and can be found from depths of 1 to 50 meters .The undulated moray is mostly nocturnal as they hide in reefs during the day and hunt for food at night.

Human use and cultural significance 
The undulated eel or Puhi and several other species of eels are featured in many Hawaiian stories. The eels are common Aumakua, thought to be ancestors protecting families.  This eel was also a common form that Ku, the Hawaiian god of war, would take to interact with humans.  For many native Hawaiian communities they were an important food source and used for special dishes when leaders had special guests.

References

External links
 Fishes of Australia : Gymnothorax undulatus
 

undulated moray
Marine fish of Northern Australia
undulated moray